Morley v Morley (1678) 22 ER 817 is an English trusts law case, concerning the duty of care owed by a trustee.

Facts
A trust fund was the victim of a robbery, and £40 of gold was taken.

Judgment
Lord Nottingham LC held that a trustee could not be liable if £40 of the trust fund's gold was robbed, so long as he otherwise performed his duties.

See also

English trust law

References

English trusts case law
1678 in law
1678 in England
Court of Chancery cases